Potentate may refer to:

 Imperial Potentate, the title of the head of the Shriners
 Potentate, three-time winner of the Welsh Champion Hurdle (1997-1999)
 St. Ambrose's term for a Power in Christian angelology